Santa Cruz Municipality is a municipality in Sonora in northwestern Mexico.

Geography

Adjacent municipalities and counties 

 Cananea Municipality - east and southeast
 Ímuris Municipality - southwest
 Nogales Municipality - west
 Santa Cruz County, Arizona - north
 Cochise County, Arizona - northeast

Towns and villages 

The largest localities (cities, towns, and villages) are:

References 

Municipalities of Sonora